Reticular describes a set of connective tissue, fibers, etc., in network form such as with cross-link bonds.

Reticular may also refer to:

 Reticular formation, a region in the brainstem that is involved in multiple tasks
 Reticular activating system, a set of connected nuclei in the brains of vertebrates
 Reticular cell, a type of fibroblast that produces reticular fibers
 Reticular connective tissue, a type of connective tissue that has a network of reticular fibers
 Reticular fiber, a type of fiber in connective tissue that is composed of type III collagen
 Reticular dermis, the lower layer of the dermis composed of dense irregular connective tissue
 Reticular dysgenesis, a rare genetic disorder of the bone marrow
 Reticular erythematous mucinosis, a skin condition that tends to affect women in the third and fourth decades of life
 Reticular layer, a layer in the adrenal cortex that produces androgens
 Reticular pigmented anomaly of the flexures, a fibrous anomaly of the flexures or bending parts of the axillae, neck and inframammary/sternal areas

See also 
 Reticulation (disambiguation)
 Reticulum (disambiguation)